Black drop may refer to:

Black drop effect, an optical phenomenon visible during a transit of Venus
Kendal Black Drop, names sometimes used for a 19th century medicine made with opium
Pitch drop experiment, demonstration of the time that it takes for a drop of pitch to fall